Chahat Mani Pandey  is an Indian television actress who has portrayed lead roles as Pakhi Parekh in Hamari Bahu Silk, Durga Aneja in Durga – Mata Ki Chhaya and Mahua Mishra in Nath – Zewar Ya Zanjeer.

Personal life 
Chahat Pandey was born and raised in Chandi Chopra village, Damoh, Madhya Pradesh. Her mother is Bhavna  Pandey. She studied in Chandi Chopra to the 5th standard. Her father died when she was young.  She completed the 10th standard from Adarsh School in Jabalpur Naka, and the 12th standard at JPB school, both in Damoh district. She also did acting training in Indore with Balaji Group. She moved to Mumbai to pursue her acting career.

In June 2020, Pandey and her mother were arrested and jailed on charges of breaking into her uncle's apartment, vandalising it, and assaulting him.

Career 
Pandey debuted in 2016 in the television soap opera Pavitra Bandhan, where she portrayed Mishti Roy Choudhary, the younger daughter of the main character Girish, who returns from having lived in America. She also had episodic roles in the crime dramatisation series Savdhaan India. In 2017, Pandey featured in the teaser trailer for the soap opera RadhaKrishn as the lead character Radha, but was later replaced by Mallika Singh.

Pandey played the lead role of Pakhi Parekh in the 2019 TV serial Hamari Bahu Silk, where she played the role of a voice artist who dubs for an actress who stars in a number of sensual films but has a hoarse voice in real life. In 2020, she and the other actors on the show complained that they had not received their payment dues, and that she was getting asked by her landlord to leave for not paying rent. There were also rumours that she had attempted to kill herself but she soon refuted, saying her mother's statement was misunderstood. The issue concerning her payment dues was eventually resolved in 2021.

In February 2020, while shooting an episode for Mere Sai - Shraddha Aur Saburi, Pandey was briefly injured and hospitalized when she stepped on a piece of glass while barefoot.

She portrayed the title character Durga Aneja, who is a god gifted child born with boons from Goddess Durga, in the television series Durga – Mata Ki Chhaya, which ran on Star Bharat from December 2020 to March 2021. Since August 2021, Pandey is starring as Mahua in the Dangal TV show Nath Zewar Ya Zanjeer, where Mahua is a girl fighting against the nath system prevailing in certain rural parts of India.

Filmography

Television

See also 
 List of Hindi television actresses
 List of Indian television actresses

References

External links 
 

Living people
1999 births
Indian television actresses
Actresses in Hindi television
Indian soap opera actresses
21st-century Indian actresses
People from Damoh
Actresses from Madhya Pradesh